Mark Gayn, born Mark Julius Ginsbourg (21 April 1909 – 17 December 1981) was an American and Canadian journalist, who worked for The Toronto Star for 30 years.

Background
Mark Julius Ginsbourg was born in 1909 in Barim, Manchuria, in the Qing Empire (today Balin [], Yakeshi in Inner Mongolia, China) to Russian-Jewish parents who had migrated from the Russian Empire. He went to school in Vladivostok in the Soviet Union and then in Shanghai, China.  He was accepted to Pomona College in Claremont, California, in the United States where he majored in political science.  Following his graduation from Pomona, he entered the Columbia University Graduate School of Journalism , graduating in 1934.

Career
Ginsbourg got into his career in the 1930s as a stringer (journalism) for Washington Post in the Shanghai.  He returned to the U.S. shortly after World War II broke out in Europe, changing his name to Gayn to prevent Japanese reprisals against his brother Sam, who remained in Japanese-occupied Shanghai.  Gayn also went on to write for Collier's and was arrested in the FBI raid on the offices of the Institute for Pacific Relations' Amerasia office in June 1945.  At the time of his arrest, he was reporting not only for Colliers but also the Chicago Sun as well as TIME Magazine.

However, the charges were dropped shortly thereafter—the New York Times described him as "quickly vindicated in the courts." The State Department refused to admit his Hungarian-born wife Suzanne Lengvary to the United States, on the grounds of her alleged Communist sympathies, so he moved to Canada and continued his work as a foreign affairs correspondent.

He filed reports on North Korean dictator Kim Il Sung's repression and, as one of the first Western journalists admitted into China in the mid-1960s, he managed to criticize the country's Maoist regimentation.

Within the U.S., Gayn's work appeared within the New York Times as well as in Newsweek and in Time magazine.

Death
At the time of his death from cancer on December 17, 1981, Gayn was still the senior foreign affairs correspondent for the Toronto Star in Toronto, Ontario, Canada.

Legacy

The Mark Gayn Papers—covering his 50 years as a journalist—were given to the Thomas Fisher Rare Book Library at the University of Toronto before his death in 1981.

Works
During his life, Mark Gayn wrote four books: The Fight for the Pacific published in 1942, Journey From the East: An Autobiography published in 1944, Japan Diary published in 1948 and republished in 1989 and New Japan Diary which was published after his death in December 1981.

Notes

References 

1909 births
1981 deaths
People from Hulunbuir
Russian Jews
Emigrants from the Russian Empire to the United States
American people of Russian-Jewish descent
Jewish Chinese history
20th-century American writers
Columbia University Graduate School of Journalism alumni
Pomona College alumni
20th-century American journalists
20th-century Canadian journalists
Canadian spies